A. constricta  may refer to:
 Aaadonta constricta, a land snail species endemic to Palau
 Acacia constricta, the whitethorn acacia, a shrub species native to Mexico and the southwestern United States
 Alstonia constricta, the quinine bush or bitterbark, a shrub species endemic to Australia